Kesar Da Dhaba is a vegetarian Punjabi dhaba in Amritsar, Punjab, India, that originated as a small restaurant selling dal and roti set up by Lala Kesar Mal, a Punjabi Hindu in Sheikhupura, near Lahore in 1916. It moved to Amritsar after the partition of India in 1947. Lala Lajpat Rai, Jawaharlal Nehru, Indira Gandhi, Padmini Kolhapuri, Yash Chopra and Rajesh Khanna are said to have eaten here. It is a small dhaba, in a narrow lane in Chowk Passian near Town Hall. 

Its signature dish is dal makhani (dal with butter). They are also known for phirni served in earthen bowls.

Anthony Bourdain visited the restaurant as part of his Anthony Bourdain: Parts Unknown series.

Some of the scenes of Saif Ali Khan’s 2017 movie Chef were shot here.

See also
 List of vegetarian restaurants

References

Indian cuisine
Amritsar
Vegetarian restaurants

Restaurants in India
1916 establishments in India
Companies based in Punjab, India
8. Kesar Da Dhaba Amritsar, Serving 100 years old dal recipe

External links
 Official web-site